Rhexipanchax is a genus of poeciliid fishes native to tropical West Africa.

Species
There are currently four recognized species in this genus:
 Rhexipanchax kabae (Daget, 1962)
 Rhexipanchax lamberti (Daget, 1962) (Lambert's lampeye)
 Rhexipanchax nimbaensis (Daget, 1948) (Mt. Nimba lampeye)
 Rhexipanchax schioetzi (Scheel, 1968) (Schiötz' lampeye)

References

Poeciliidae

Freshwater fish genera
Ray-finned fish genera